Terence Bernard McGuire (1881–1957) was the Roman Catholic Bishop of Townsville in Queensland and the Roman Catholic Bishop of Goulburn and the Roman Catholic Archbishop of Canberra and Goulburn in New South Wales, all in Australia.

Early life 
McGuire was born on 19 September 1881 in Moree, New South Wales.

Religious life 
McGuire was the Bishop of Townsville from 12 February 1930 to 14 June 1938. He was appointed the Bishop of Goulburn from 14 June 1938, becoming the Archbishop of Canberra and Goulburn on 5 February 1948.

Later life 
McGuire died on 4 July 1957.

References 

Roman Catholic bishops of Townsville
1881 births
1957 deaths
Roman Catholic bishops of Goulburn
Roman Catholic archbishops of Canberra and Goulburn